Serkan Köse (born 1976) is a Swedish politician and member of the Riksdag, the national legislature. A member of the Social Democratic Party, he has represented Stockholm County since September 2018.  He had previously been a substitute member of the Riksdag for Magdalena Andersson twice: October 2014 to March 2017; and September 2017 to September 2018.

Kronstål is the son of Mehmet Köse and Ayse Köse. He was educated in Botkyrka Municipality and studied at Stockholm University from where he has a Doctor of Philosophy degree in political science. He has been a member of the municipal council in Botkyrka Municipality since 2014.

References

1976 births
Living people
Members of the Riksdag 2018–2022
Members of the Riksdag 2022–2026
Members of the Riksdag from the Social Democrats
People from Botkyrka Municipality
Stockholm University alumni